Rustam Singh (born July 9, 1945 in gurjar family in village Girgao Gwalior, (Madhya Pradesh) is an Indian politician and member of the Bharatiya Janata Party. He is a former member of Madhya Pradesh Assembly from South constituency of Morena. He lost in 2018 Madhya Pradesh Assembly election from Morena against the Indian National Congress leader.

He is a former IPS officer and served as Inspector General of Raipur.

Political career
He was Minister of Sports and Youth Welfare, Food and Civil Supplies, Public Health and Family Welfare, Backward Classes and Minorities Welfare, Biodiversity and Biotechnology and Panchayat and Rural Development in 2003. He was re-inducted in Shivraj Singh Chouhan's cabinet as Minister of Public Health and Family Welfare.

References 

People from Morena district
Bharatiya Janata Party politicians from Madhya Pradesh
Madhya Pradesh MLAs 2013–2018
Living people
1945 births